"" is a Swedish language song by Swedish singer Theoz, released as a single on  5 February 2022. It was performed in Melodifestivalen 2022 and made it to the final on 12 March 2022.

Track listing

Charts

Weekly charts

Year-end charts

References

2022 songs
2022 singles
Melodifestivalen songs of 2022